Epirinus is a genus of dung beetles in the tribe Deltochilini (subfamily Scarabaeinae) of the scarab family. It comprises 29 species from southern Africa; a few species are widespread in the region, but most have limited ranges. Length ranges from 3.0 mm to 13.5 mm.

Ecology
Most species in this genus feed on herbivore dung, although some are known to eat carrion. Some of the larger species roll balls of dung, whereas smaller species have been found in leaf litter. The genus includes both flying and flightless species.

Taxonomy
Species include:
Epirinus aeneus  (Wiedemann, 1823)
Epirinus aquilus  Medina & Scholtz, 2005 
Epirinus asper  Peringuey, 1901
Epirinus bentoi Ferreira, 1964 
Epirinus comosus  Peringuey, 1901
Epirinus convexus  Scholtz & Howden, 1987
Epirinus davisi  Scholtz & Howden, 1987 
Epirinus drakomontanus  Scholtz & Howden, 1987
Epirinus flagellatus  (Fabricius, 1775)
Epirinus granulatus  Scholtz & Howden, 1987 
Epirinus gratus  Peringuey, 1901
Epirinus hilaris  Peringuey, 1901
Epirinus hluhluwensis  Medina & Scholtz, 2005
Epirinus hopei  Castelnau, 1840
Epirinus minimus  Medina & Scholtz, 2005 
Epirinus montanus  Scholtz & Howden, 1987
Epirinus mucrodentatus  Scholtz & Howden, 1987
Epirinus ngomae  Medina & Scholtz, 2005
Epirinus obtusus  Boheman, 1857 
Epirinus pseudorugosus  Medina & Scholtz, 2005
Epirinus punctatus  Scholtz & Howden, 1987 
Epirinus pygidialis  Scholtz & Howden, 1987 
Epirinus relictus  Scholtz & Howden, 1987
Epirinus rugosus  Scholtz & Howden, 1987
Epirinus scrobiculatus  Harold, 1880 
Epirinus sebastiani  Medina & Scholtz, 2005
Epirinus silvestris  Cambefort, 1978
Epirinus striatus  Scholtz & Howden, 1987
Epirinus sulcipennis  Boheman, 1857
Epirinus validus  Peringuey, 1901

References

Deltochilini